Harold Huyton Francis (1 May 1928 – 2 January 2016), known as Tim Francis, was a New Zealand diplomat. He was the nation's permanent representative to the United Nations from 1978 to 1982, and Ambassador to the United States from 1988 to 1991. From 1984 to 1988, he was the Administrator of Tokelau,

References 

1928 births
2016 deaths
Permanent Representatives of New Zealand to the United Nations
Ambassadors of New Zealand to the United States
Administrators of Tokelau
People from Auckland
Alumni of the University of Oxford
University of Auckland alumni
Deaths from cancer in New Zealand